Gyan Bagh Palace constructed in 1890 is a noble palace constructed in European architecture style is located in Hyderabad, India.

References

Palaces in Hyderabad, India
1890 establishments in India